Long Branch is a  long 2nd order tributary to Whitethorn Creek in Pittsylvania County, Virginia.

Course 
Long Branch rises in a pond in Gretna, Virginia and then flows generally southeast to join Whitethorn Creek about 0.5 miles southeast of Gretna Rolling Mill.

Watershed 
Long Branch drains  of area, receives about 45.6 in/year of precipitation, has a wetness index of 410.64, and is about 49% forested.

See also 
 List of Virginia Rivers

References 

Rivers of Virginia
Rivers of Pittsylvania County, Virginia
Tributaries of the Roanoke River